Senegalensis and its alternative form senegalense are Latin adjectival suffixes meaning pertaining to, or originating in Senegal. They are often used as the second word of a binomial name. 

Senegalensis/senegalense could refer to any of the following species:

Mammals
 the Senegal bushbaby, Galago senegalensis
 the African manatee Trichechus senegalensis

Birds

 the African finfoot, Podica senegalensis
 the African scops owl, Otus senegalensis
 the northern yellow white-eye Zosterops senegalensis
 the laughing dove, Stigmatopelia senegalensis
 the mosque swallow, Cecropis senegalensis
 the saddle-billed stork Ephippiorhynchus senegalensis
 the scarlet-chested sunbird Nectarinia senegalensis
 the Senegal batis Batis senegalensis
 the Senegal coucal, Centropus senegalensis
 the white-bellied korhaan Eupodotis senegalensis
 the woodland kingfisher Halcyon senegalensis

Amphibians

 the frog Kassina senegalensis

Fish

 Labeo senegalensis

Insects

 the forest grass yellow butterfly, Eurema senegalensis
 Ischnura senegalensis, a blue-tailed damselfly
 the ground beetle Calosoma senegalense
 the praying mantis Oxyothespis senegalensis
 the picture-winged fly Cliochloria senegalensis

Arachnids

 the banded-legged golden orb-web spider, Nephila senegalensis

Molluscs

 the Faval Auger, Oxymeris senegalensis
 the sea-snail Tenagodus senegalensis
 the sea-snail Xenophora senegalensis
 the sea-snail Gibbula senegalensis
 the sea-snail Nerita senegalensis
 the sea-snail Simnia senegalensis
 the sea-snail Aporrhais senegalensis
 the sea-snail Plagyostila senegalensis
 the sea-snail Mitromorpha senegalensis
 the sea-snail Crisilla senegalensis
 the sea-snail Siratus senegalensis
 the sea-snail Mangelia senegalensis
 the sea-snail Marginella senegalensis
 the sea-snail Cymbium senegalensis

Crustaceans

 the copepod Clausidium senegalense

Platyhelminthes

 the tapeworm Pterobothrium senegalense

Vascular plants

 the African custard-apple, Annona senegalensis
 the African mahogany, Khaya senegalensis
 the sweet detar, Detarium senegalense
 Zanthoxylum senegalense, a synonym for the Senegal prickly-ash, Zanthoxylum zanthoxyloides
 the spurge Anthostema senegalense
 the grass Panicum senegalense
 the knotweed Polygonum senegalense
 Guiera senegalensis
 the Aizen, Boscia senegalensis
 the Senegal tamarisk, Tamarix senegalensis
 the tree Saba senegalensis

Fungi

 Curvularia senegalensis
 Sorosporium senegalense, a synonym for Moesziomyces bullatus

Mycobacteria

 the mycobacterium Mycobacterium senegalense